Parequula melbournensis, the silverbelly, Melbourne silver biddy or silver biddy, is a species of fish in the family Garreidae, the mojarras. The species was first described by Francis de Laporte de Castelnau in 1872. It is the only member of the monotypic genus Parequula erected by Franz Steindachner in 1879. This species can reach  in total length.

Description
P. melbournensis is similar to Gerres subfasciatus, but can be distinguished from G. subfasciatus by its long-based anal fin and dorsal fin that is not anteriorly elevated.

See also
 List of fishes of the Houtman Abrolhos

References

External links

 Images. FishBase.

Gerreidae
Fish of Australia
Monotypic fish genera
Fish described in 1872